Wendlandia angustifolia is a species of plant in the family Rubiaceae. It is endemic to Tamil Nadu, India. The species was presumed to be extinct until 1998, when it was rediscovered after a gap of 81 years near its previously known natural habitat, during an inventory of threatened plants of Kalakkad Mundantharai Tiger Reserve, Tamil Nadu.

References

angustifolia
Flora of Tamil Nadu
Taxonomy articles created by Polbot